Allen Miller (born April 18, 1940) is a former American football linebacker in the National Football League (NFL) for the Washington Redskins during the 1962 and 1963 seasons.  He played college football at Ohio University and was drafted in the 17th round of the 1962 NFL Draft.  Miller was also selected in the 17th round of the 1962 AFL Draft by the New York Titans.  He later played in the Canadian Football League (CFL) from 1964 to 1968, mostly with the Winnipeg Blue Bombers, and earned an All-Star Team nomination in 1965.

Miller's son is former Blue Bomber player and current President and Chief Operating Officer Wade Miller.  Another son, Ritchie, works as an on-field official for the CFL.

References

1940 births
Living people
American football linebackers
American players of Canadian football
Hamilton Tiger-Cats players
Ohio Bobcats football players
People from Fostoria, Ohio
Saskatchewan Roughriders players
Washington Redskins players
Winnipeg Blue Bombers players